Perum Cheral Irumporai, known as the Victor of Tagadur, was a member of the Irumporai line of the Chera dynasty in early historic south India  (c. 1st - 4th century CE). Perum Cheral is sometimes identified with Perum Kadungo, the Irumporai Chera royal mentioned in the Pugalur inscriptions.

He is famous for the victory of Tagadur of Adigaman chieftain Ezhni. He is the hero of the eighth chapter of the Pathittupattu composed by poet Arichil Kizhar.

References 

Tamil monarchs
People of the Chera kingdom
Chera kings